Luis Ruiz may refer to:
 Luis Ruiz Tagle (1898–?), Chilean sports shooter
 Luis Ruiz Suárez (1913–2011), Spanish missionary
 Luis Ruiz (footballer, born 1987), Colombian footballer
 Luis Ruiz (footballer, born 1992), Spanish footballer
 Luis Ruiz (footballer, born 1997), Venezuelan footballer
 Luis Ruiz (Oz), a character on the TV series Oz